The 3rd Count of Cardona, Joan Ramon II Folc de Cardona (14 June 14001471), was a Catalan nobleman in the late Middle Ages. HIs titles included Count of Cardona and Count-consort of Prades, as well as Viscount of Vilamur. 'Juan Ramón Folch de Cardona y Ximenez de Arenós'

His parents were Joan Ramon I, 2nd Count of Cardona, and his wife Joana de Gandia.

Biography 
He was born in (circa) 1400.  In 1404, he received the Viscountcy of Vilamur from his family.

When his father, the 2nd Count of Cardona, died, he inherited the title of Admiral of Aragon.

on 22 May 1423, he was made 3rd Count of Cardona, Admiral of Aragon by the Lieutenant of Aragon and queen in charge of Aragonese–Catalan affairs on behalf of her absent husband, Alfonso V of Aragon, who resided at Naples, Italy. He became, at the age of four years, 1st Viscount of Vilamur in 1404. Almost twenty years later,

In 1430?, Folch commanded a fleet of 22 galleys and eight big ships, assisting Aragonese king Alfonso V of Aragon, (1395 - king of Aragon and Sicily 1416 - king of Naples "manu militari" between 1434 - 1458), who was besieged  in Naples. On his return home, he took the French city of Marseille. For his actions he was awarded by Alfonso V of Aragon brother, king John II of Aragon, (king successor 1458 - 1479) the Sicilian town of Termes, in 1463, during which time King John II was at Tudela, kingdom of Navarre, where he was disputing with his son, Charles of Viana, the Navarrese throne, illegally, in spite of being a widower of Queen Blanca I of Navarre, (1385–1441).

King don Juan II, battling against his own rebelling Catalan subjects, experienced extreme difficulties in 1467, but in 1468, the younger son of later king (since 1479) John II of Aragon, 16-year-old Ferdinand II of Aragon, received the military help of this 3rd Count of Cardona, who died in 1471.

In the aftermath of the Compromis de Casp, the young Joan Ramon was still planned to marry Cecilia de Urgell, sister of the vanquished throne candidate Jaume, Count of Urgell. However, by 1418 this wedding project for him had ended in failure.

Instead, the young heir Joan Ramon de Cardona was in 1418 married with Joana de Prades, a younger sister of the Dowager Queen Margarida.

and Juana Gonzalva Ximenez de Arenós, Countess of Prades, Lady of the Barony of Entença (Sp. ), sister of the Margerida de Prades who married the aged and ailing King Martin I of Aragon

Joana inherited the county of Prades and the barony of Entenza, by royal decision of 1425. This made the young Joan Ramon a sitting peer, Count of Prades, in the parliament, already in lifetime of his father. It even meant that the son's rank was higher than the father's, because Prades was a more senior peerage. The father and son always presented themselves together in the parliament. The younger Joan Ramon was active in parliamentary politics.

His father died in 1442, and Joan Ramon II inherited Cardona too. In 1445, as a belated consequence of the death of his father, he decided to renounce Prades and Vilamur in favor of his own son, Joan Ramon III.

However, from about 1445, he also lived in retirement in Cardona, taking an abstentionist role to politics. When the civil war broke out in 1462, the county of Cardona was one of the loyals of don Juan the Unreliable. Despite of the old count's inactivity, this loyalty caused the Catalan authorities to declare the elderly Count Joan Ramon II as enemy of the Principality of Catalonia, in 1462.

Count Joan Ramon II died in 1471 at Cardona, Bages.

Family

Sources

 Enciclopedia catalana

1400 births
1471 deaths
Counts